The IVECO Effeuno is a class of Italian buses built between 1984 and 1989 by IVECO. They consisted of three different models with different internal arrangement: IVECO 471 for urban services, IVECO 571 for suburban services, and IVECO 671 for interurban services.

Engines were, for the urban version, a Fiat 8220.12, with 9572 cc and 203 HP, with an automatic transmission which could be chosen between Voith D851, ZF 4HP-500 or DB. The interurban and articulated version had a turbocharged Iveco with 9570 cc and 240 HP, with a ZF 5HP-500 automatic transmission.

The buses were provided (depending from the sub-manufacturer chosen by the customer) with two different chassis length, 10.5 m and 12 m. There was also an articulated version with a length of 18 m.

The bus was in service with numerous public transport companies in Italy, the first unit having been decommissioned starting from the 1990s-early 2000s.

The series was replaced by similar IVECO 480 class.

See also 
 List of buses

External links
 
 Page with photos and technical details 

Effeuno